FK Humenné is a Slovak association football club located in Humenné. The club was established in 2003 and it plays in 2. liga.

Honours
 3. Liga (Group East) (1993–)
  Winners (1): 2020–21

Colors and badge 
Its colors are yellow and blue.

Current squad 
As of 3 March 2023

For recent transfers, see List of Slovak football transfers winter 2022–23.

Notable managers 

 Jozef Valkučák (TBA–2017)
 Puniša Memedovič (2017–2018)
 Vladimír Sivý (January 2019)
 Jozef Škrlík (February 2019–June 2019)
 Peter Košuda (June 2019–January 2020)
 Jozef Škrlík (January 2020–May 2022)
 Ondrej Desiatnik (June 2022–October 2022)
 Andrej Čirák (October 2022–November 2022)
 Jozef Kukulský (December 2022–present)

References

External links
  
Futbalnet profile 

 
Association football clubs established in 2003
Sport in Humenné
2003 establishments in Slovakia